Umčani may refer to:

 Umčani, Bosnia and Herzegovina, a village near Trnovo
 Umčani, Croatia, a village near Vrgorac